In pathology, a contracture is a permanent shortening of a muscle or joint. It is usually in response to prolonged hypertonic spasticity in a concentrated muscle area, such as is seen in the tightest muscles of people with conditions like spastic cerebral palsy, but can also be due to the congenital abnormal development of muscles and connective tissue in the womb.

Contractures develop when normally elastic tissues such as muscles or tendons are replaced by inelastic tissues (fibrosis). This results in the shortening and hardening of these tissues, ultimately causing rigidity, joint deformities and a total loss of movement around the joint. Most of the physical therapy, occupational therapy and other exercise regimens targeted towards people with spasticity focuses on trying to prevent contractures from happening in the first place. However, research on sustained traction of connective tissue in approaches such as adaptive yoga has demonstrated that contracture can be reduced, at the same time that tendency toward spasticity is addressed.

Contractures can also be due to ischemia (restriction of blood flow) leading to the death of muscle tissue, as in Volkmann's contracture. They can also be caused by excessive myofibroblast and matrix metalloproteinase accumulation in wound margins following injury.

See also
 Arthrogryposis
 Burn scar contracture
 Capsular contracture
 Clubfoot
 Dupuytren's contracture
 Freeman–Sheldon syndrome
 Marden–Walker syndrome
 Muscle contracture

References

External links 

Muscular disorders
Early complications of trauma